The Marquis of Clanricarde is a Grade II listed public house at 36 Southwick Street, Paddington, London, W2.

It was built in the early-mid 19th century.

References

Grade II listed pubs in the City of Westminster
Paddington